Caloptilia betulivora is a moth of the family Gracillariidae. It is known from Canada (Nova Scotia and Québec) the United States.

The larvae feed on Betula species, including Betula alleghaniensis, Betula papyrifera and Betula populifolia. They mine the leaves of their host plant.

References

betulivora
Moths of North America
Moths described in 1946